Mona Awad is a Canadian novelist and short-story writer. Her debut book, 13 Ways of Looking at a Fat Girl, a novel (structured using linked short stories) about a woman's lifelong struggle with body image issues, won the Amazon.ca First Novel Award and was shortlisted for the Scotiabank Giller Prize in 2016. She was inspired to write the book because of her experiences growing up and struggling with her own body image. In the Los Angeles Times, Awad has been quoted as saying, she "made [music] playlists for every chapter" in 13 Ways of Looking at a Fat Girl because it helped her "immerse" herself in the story and better "access it."

Biography
Awad was born and raised in Montreal, Quebec and she spent her teen years in Mississauga, Ontario. She studied English literature at York University and went on to earn a masters in English at the University of Edinburgh, an MFA at Brown University, and a PhD at the University of Denver. Awad's short fiction and non-fiction writing has been published in magazines including McSweeney's, The Walrus, Joyland, Post Road, St. Petersburg Review, and Maisonneuve. When Awad began writing as a columnist for Maisonneuve, she used the pseudonym Veronica Tartley.

Awad desires for her stories to provide readers with "a sense of connection" so that "people [may] feel less alone."

In 2017, Awad's short story Woman Causes Avalanche was published by the L.A. Review of Books.

Her next novel, Bunny, was published in June, 2019, by Viking Press. Bunny tells the story of a girl named Samantha Mackey who attends a prestigious graduate program located in New England, at the fictional Warren University. There Samantha finds herself entangled in the weird rituals led by the "Bunnies" — her fellow students who are more than just the clique that they seem on the surface.  

Her third novel, All's Well, was released on August 3, 2021 by Simon & Schuster.

She has lived in the US since 2009, currently in Boston.

References

External links
 
 Mona Awad: For award-winning writing and fearless storytelling, Canadian Arab Institute, Institut canado-arabe, CAI, Toronto

21st-century Canadian novelists
21st-century Canadian short story writers
1978 births
Canadian women novelists
Canadian people of Moroccan descent
Canadian women short story writers
Canadian magazine writers
Writers from Mississauga
Writers from Montreal
York University alumni
Brown University alumni
Living people
21st-century Canadian women writers
Amazon.ca First Novel Award winners